Saint-Jean-de-Bonneval is a commune in the Aube department in north-central France. It features a noted church, the Église paroissiale Saint-Jean-Baptiste, built in 1830 after the previous church collapsed.

Population

See also
Communes of the Aube department

References

Communes of Aube
Aube communes articles needing translation from French Wikipedia